Thyra, New South Wales is a parish and suburb in Cadell County, Southern New South Wales, Australia. It is located 15 km north of Echuca, Victoria at 35°49′54″S 144°41′04″E and is on the Balranald branch line of the Deniliquin railway line and in Murray River Council.

One church building remains the only public building, and the nearest town is Mathoura.

History
Thyra was on the border of the traditional lands of the Yorta Yorta peoples, and their neighbors the Baraba baraba.

The first Europeans to the area were Hamilton Hume and William Hovell, in 1824, and Captain Charles Sturt in 1830. In In 1852 Francis Cadell, began a steam ship service. The nearby Murray river here is still navigable by paddle steamer.

Climate

Agriculture remains the main economic activity and Electorally the parish is in the Division of Farrer.

References

Localities in New South Wales